Saint Acacius (died  304) was a 4th-century priest who lived in Sebaste, Armenia, during the Diocletianic Persecution. Under the governor Maximus (284–305) seven women and two children were brought to justice in Sebaste. The women were accused of having tempted their husbands to become Christians. They did not lose their dignity even under the harsh torture. One of the executioners, Irenarchus, was so impressed by their attitude to their faith that he joined them. It was the priest Acacius who administered the baptism of Irenarchus. All of them suffered of torture and were killed by the sword or the stake. They are venerated in the Orthodox church and their feast day is on November 27.

This Acacius should not be confused with the soldier Acacius, one of the Forty Martyrs of Sebaste.

References

3rd-century births
4th-century deaths
4th-century Christian clergy
Armenian saints
4th-century Christian saints
People from Sivas
Christians martyred during the reign of Diocletian